Mayfair Mall is a shopping mall located on Mayfair Road (Highway 100) between North Avenue and Center Street in Wauwatosa, Wisconsin, United States. It serves the Greater Milwaukee area, also Wisconsin's premier shopping Center and Largest Mall in Wisconsin with 175 stores. Mayfair Shopping Center was constructed from 1956 and completed in 1959 by the Hunzinger Construction Company.  It has been expanded several times since it was first built.

The mall contains 164 stores and the anchor stores are Macy's, Crate & Barrel, Barnes & Noble, Nordstrom and AMC Theatres. There is one vacant anchor store that was once Boston Store.

History
Mayfair Mall opened in October 1958, featuring more than 70 stores. The mall's original design was a  open-air concourse, with Marshall Field's as the northern anchor and Gimbels as the southern anchor. Chicago-based Marshall Field's opened at Mayfair in 1959 to complement Gimbels, which opened just prior to Mayfair being dedicated.  Three east–west corridors (North Mall, Central Park, and South Mall) ran the width of the mall, with each corridor decorated in a different color. The mall's central court also featured a park, which included trees, flowers, benches and picnic tables.

In 1973, the new Mayfair Mall was advertised. The mall was fully enclosed. An arcade called The Bazaar replaced the Central Park area of Mayfair. An office tower was built on the southwest side of the mall in 1975, and construction began on a second in November 1977.

In 1986, Mayfair was rededicated following a $15 million remodeling effort. The Bazaar and a short-lived ice rink were both removed. A two-level atrium was built, featuring a new food court. The upper level was also expanded, adding  of retail space. Following this expansion, the mall included 109 stores including Milwaukee based Boston Store which replaced Gimbels.

In 1998, the shopping center was purchased by General Growth Properties. The second floor of the atrium was expanded across the entire mall adding new restaurants and shops. A cinema was also added, acting as a third anchor at Mayfair.

Mayfair dealt with increased competition from other Milwaukee area shopping centers, including Bayshore Town Center, which underwent remodeling and nearby Brookfield Square. A teen curfew was instituted in the 2010s due to several incidents within the mall and after films at the multiplex let out on weekends.

In 2005, a Crate & Barrel opened in front of the main mall entrance. The General Cinema multiplex was acquired by AMC Theatres after GCC's purchase by AMC. Marshall Field's converted to Macy's in 2006 as part of the broad rebranding of the Federated Department Stores to the Macy's label.

Nordstrom opened in the mall in 2015. It was the first full-line Nordstrom store to open in the state of Wisconsin. Nordstrom wanted to meet such high demand, and Milwaukee was the largest metropolitan area without a Nordstrom.

Boston Store closed in 2018 due to Bon-Ton filing for Chapter 11 bankruptcy protection and closing all stores.

2020 shootings 

On February 2, 2020, Alvin Cole, a 17-year-old, was killed in an incident with police. Cole fired a bullet from a gun before being shot five times by an officer. The officer was suspended and eventually resigned after an independent investigation led by former U.S. Attorney Steven Biskupic called for his dismissal due to him being involved in two other fatal shootings, among other issues.  The investigation revealed that Cole never shot an officer; the only bullet Cole fired hitting himself in the arm while running away and dropping to the ground.

On November 20, 2020, a mass shooting occurred at the mall. Eight non-life-threatening injuries were reported, drawing a massive emergency response, including the FBI. The shooter fled the scene afterwards. A 15-year-old was arrested in connection with the shooting.

The Mayfair Collection

In fall 2015, a new shopping center opened just northwest of Mayfair Mall known as The Mayfair Collection. It has stores like Nordstrom Rack, Old Navy, Dick's Sporting Goods, Whole Foods Market, and Versona Accessories. It also has a Homewood Suites by Hilton hotel. as well as a planned apartment complex known as Uptown at the District and several restaurants as well. Phase 2 is yet to be complete with stores and restaurants.

References

External links
Mayfair Mall

Brookfield Properties
Shopping malls in Wisconsin
Tourist attractions in Milwaukee County, Wisconsin
Shopping malls established in 1958
Wauwatosa, Wisconsin
Buildings and structures in Milwaukee County, Wisconsin